Vidor is a city in western Orange County, Texas, United States. The town is mainly a bedroom community for the nearby refining complexes in Beaumont and Port Arthur and is part of the Beaumont-Port Arthur metropolitan statistical area. Its population was 9,789 at the 2020 census.

The area was heavily logged after the construction of the Texarkana and Fort Smith Railway that was later part of a line that ran from Kansas City to Port Arthur, Texas. The city was named after lumberman Charles Shelton Vidor, owner of the Miller-Vidor Lumber Company and father of director King Vidor. By 1909, the Vidor community had a post office and four years later a company tram road was built. Almost all Vidor residents worked for the company. In 1924, the Miller-Vidor Lumber Company moved to Lakeview, just north of Vidor, in search of virgin timber. A small settlement remained and the Miller-Vidor subdivision was laid out in 1929.

Vidor had and still has a reputation as a "sundown town", where African Americans are not allowed after sunset. In 1993, after district court judge William Wayne Justice ordered that 36 counties in East Texas, including Vidor, desegregate public housing by making some units available for minorities, the Klan from another area held a march in the community after a long legal battle was lost by Vidor's leaders. Church leaders held a well-attended prayer rally in opposition to the KKK hatred. After four Black families moved into the complex, the residents suffered racial threats including a bomb threat to the complex. All nine Black residents eventually moved out under this pressure. One of the residents, Bill Simpson, was interviewed about his negative experiences while living there. "I've had people who drive by and tell me they're going home to get a rope and come back and hang me. . . ." Shortly after moving out of the complex, Mr. Simpson was killed in Beaumont, coincidentally, by a black gang. During the George Floyd protests of 2020, Black Lives Matter held a rally in Vidor that was attended by a diverse crowd of 150–200 people.

In 2005, 2008, and 2017, Vidor and surrounding areas suffered extensive damage from Hurricanes Rita, Ike, and Harvey. A mandatory evacuation was imposed upon its residents for about two weeks.

Geography

Vidor is located at  (30.131492, –93.996292).

Demographics

As of the 2020 United States census, there were 9,789 people, 4,129 households, and 2,639 families residing in the city.

As of the census of 2000, 11,440 people, 4,222 households, and 3,158 families were residing in the city. The population density was 1,083.6 people per square mile (418.3/km). The 4,652 housing units  averaged 440.6 per square mile (170.1/km). The racial makeup of the city was 97.3% White, 0.1% African American, 0.5% Native American, 0.2% Asian, 0.73% from other races, and 1.21% from two or more races. Hispanics or Latinos of any race were 3.49% of the population.

Of the 4,222 households,  34.7% had children under the age of 18 living with them, 56.3% were married couples living together, 13.4% had a female householder with no husband present, and 25.2% were not families. About 22.0% of all households were made up of individuals, and 10.3% had someone living alone who was 65 years of age or older. The average household size was 2.66, and the average family size was 3.09.

In the city, the population distribution was 26.7% under the age of 18, 9.9% from 18 to 24, 27.4% from 25 to 44, 21.9% from 45 to 64, and 14.1% who were 65 years of age or older. The median age was 35 years. For every 100 females, there were 91.5 males. For every 100 females age 18 and over, there were 87.1 males.

The median income for a household in the city was $31,982, and for a family was $37,572. Males had a median income of $35,781 versus $21,054 for females. The per capita income for the city was $15,381. About 10.7% of families and 14.5% of the population were below the poverty line, including 19.5% of those under age 18 and 8.9% of those age 65 or over.

Education
The City of Vidor is served by the Vidor Independent School District, which is the largest of the six school districts in the county.

Notable people

 Tracy Byrd, country music artist
 Dean Corll, prolific 1970s Houston serial killer
 David Ray Harris, suspected murderer featured in the documentary The Thin Blue Line (and later executed for a separate murder)
 Tamara Hext, 1984 Miss Texas
 John Hirasaki, NASA mechanical engineer
 Roger Mobley, former child actor, was a police detective in Vidor
 David Ozio, Professional Bowlers Association and USBC Hall of Famer
 Don Rollins, songwriter, co-author of "It's Five O'Clock Somewhere"
 Billie Jo Spears, country music artist
 Clay Walker, country music artist

Notes

References

External links

 
 Vidor Independent School District
 

Cities in Orange County, Texas
Cities in Texas
Cities in the Beaumont–Port Arthur metropolitan area
Sundown towns in Texas